Frank Tiberi (born December 4, 1928) is an American saxophonist and the leader of the Woody Herman Orchestra. He was born in Camden, New Jersey, United States. He was picked by Woody Herman shortly before Herman's death and has led the band since 1987.

He plays the alto and tenor saxophone, bassoon, clarinet, and flute. He has been performing and recording since the age of thirteen. Tiberi toured with Benny Goodman and Urbie Green, and played with Dizzy Gillespie. He had a period in the late 1960s when he was a studio musician, although by 1969 he was hired as Herman's lead saxophone soloist. He remained in that role until Herman's, sometimes taking over his duties when ill-health affected Herman in his later years.

Tiberi is a professor at Berklee College of Music, where he teaches improvisational techniques and pedagogy. He served as director for the Camden Jazz Festival in New Jersey. He specializes in modern and contemporary jazz techniques and has released eponymous albums and with fellow Berklee instructor, George Garzone.

References

External links
 Official website
 Faculty bio at Berklee College of Music

1928 births
Living people
American jazz alto saxophonists
American jazz tenor saxophonists
American male saxophonists
American jazz bassoonists
American male jazz musicians
American jazz clarinetists
American jazz flautists
Berklee College of Music faculty
Musicians from Camden, New Jersey
Place of birth missing (living people)
21st-century American saxophonists
21st-century clarinetists
21st-century American male musicians
21st-century flautists